The common hawker, moorland hawker or sedge darner (Aeshna juncea) is one of the larger species of hawker dragonflies. It is native to Palearctic (from Ireland to Japan) and northern North America. The flight period is from June to early October.

The male has a black abdomen with paired blue and yellow spots on each abdominal segment, and narrow stripes along the dorsal surface of the thorax. In the female, the abdomen is brown with yellow or sometimes green or blue spots. The wings of both sexes display a yellow costa (the major vein running along the leading edge of the wings). This species lacks the green thorax stripes of the southern hawker.

Female common hawkers will sometimes dive out of the sky and feign death in order to avoid copulating with males.

References

External links
 
 

Dragonflies of Europe
Aeshnidae
Insects described in 1758
Odonata of Asia
Odonata of North America
Taxa named by Carl Linnaeus